Arrakis—informally known as Dune and later called Rakis—is a fictional desert planet featured in the Dune series of novels by Frank Herbert. Herbert's first novel in the series, 1965's Dune, is considered one of the greatest science fiction novels of all time, and it is sometimes cited as the best-selling science fiction novel in history.

In Dune, the planet is the home of the Fremen (Zensunni wanderers), and subsequently is the Imperial Capital of the Atreides Empire. Arrakis is the third planet orbiting the star Canopus, and it in turn is orbited by two moons, one of which has an albedo pattern resembling the desert kangaroo mouse, Muad'Dib, on it; the other moon has markings resembling a human hand.

Environment and the spice
A desert planet with no natural precipitation, in Dune it is established that Arrakis had been "His Imperial Majesty's Desert Botanical Testing Station" before the discovery of melange, for which it is the only natural source in the universe. Melange (or, "the spice") is the most essential and valuable commodity in the universe, as it extends life and makes safe interstellar travel possible (among other uses). The planet has no surface water bodies, but open canals called qanats are used "for carrying irrigation water under controlled conditions" through the desert. The Fremen collect water in underground reservoirs to fulfill their dream of someday terraforming the planet, and pay the Spacing Guild exorbitant fees in melange to keep the skies over Arrakis free of any satellites which might observe their efforts. As indicated by its large salt flats, Arrakis once had lakes and oceans; Lady Jessica also notes in Dune that wells drilled in the sinks and basins initially produce a "trickle" of water which soon stops, as if "something plugs it."

Paul Atreides recalls that the few plants and animals on the planet include "saguaro, burro bush, date palm, sand verbena, evening primrose, barrel cactus, incense bush, smoke tree, creosote bush ... kit fox, desert hawk, kangaroo mouse ... many to be found now nowhere else in the universe except here on Arrakis." The most notable life forms on the planet are the giant sandworms and their immature forms of sandtrout and sand plankton. Sandtrout encyst any water deposits; predator fish are placed in the qanats and other water storage areas to protect them from the sandtrout. It is suggested the sandworms are an introduced species that caused the desertification of Arrakis;<ref name="Children">{{cite book |last=Herbert |first=Frank |title=[[Children of Dune|Children of Dune]] |year=1976}}</ref> In Children of Dune (1976), Leto II Atreides explains to his twin sister Ghanima:
The sandtrout [...] was introduced here from some other place. This was a wet planet then. They proliferated beyond the capability of existing ecosystems to deal with them. Sandtrout encysted the available free water, made this a desert planet [...] and they did it to survive. In a planet sufficiently dry, they could move to their sandworm phase.

The environment of the desert planet Arrakis was primarily inspired by the hydrocarbon wealthy Mexico and the Middle East. Similarly Arrakis as a bioregion is presented as a particular kind of political site. Herbert has made it resemble a generic desertified petrostate.

The Dune Encyclopedia
The non-canon Dune Encyclopedia (1984) theorizes that the depletion of the oceans (the primary result of which was desertification) was probably caused by the impact or near miss of a comet or other quasi-planetary body. This event caused the loss of much of the atmosphere of Arrakis, allowing most of the oxygen and water to escape into space. This is thought to have occurred approximately 50 million years before the Imperium's creation. This catastrophic loss of oxygen led to the extinction of nearly all native flora and then therefore the fauna.

The Encyclopedia also explains that one of the few forms to survive were tiny worms of the phylum Protochordata. One of these forms was Shaihuludata, a genus of anaerobic burrowing worm that was the basal species from which the giant sandworms (Geonemotodium arraknis or Shaihuludata gigantica) evolved. Rather than sandworm creating desert, it was desert that created sandworm. The mass extinction of all of its predators and competitors for food allowed the animal, in a manner somewhat analogous to the evolution of unique faunal forms on isolated Terran islands, to take the evolutionary path that would not only re-oxygenate the Arrakeen atmosphere, but also create the spice melange with all of its immense consequences for humanity.

Finally, the Encyclopedia notes that early in the history of Arrakis, the Imperium made several attempts to terraform the planet, which resulted in an abundance of Terran desert life on the planet (such as kangaroo mice and hawks), but failed to otherwise change the environment, as the local sandtrout "encyst" any open water on the planet.

Inhabitants

 Fremen 
The Zensunni wanderers, driven from planet to planet, eventually found their way to Arrakis, where they became the Fremen. They settled in artificial cave-like settlements known as sietches across the Arrakeen deserts. They also developed stillsuit technology, allowing them to survive in the open desert. By harvesting melange, they were able to bribe the Spacing Guild for privacy from observation and weather control in order to hide from the Imperium their true population and their plans to terraform Arrakis. Much of this ecological activity took place in the unexplored southern latitudes of the planet. The best-known of the sietches is Sietch Tabr, home of Stilgar and Muad'Dib's center of operations before victory in the Battle of Arrakeen put Muad'Dib on the Imperial throne.

According to the Legends of Dune prequel trilogy by Brian Herbert and Kevin J. Anderson, it was a group of Zensunni wanderers escaping slavery on the planet Poritrin who originally crashed on Dune in a prototype interstellar spacecraft several years prior to the creation of the Spacing Guild.

Plotlines
During the events of Dune, the Padishah Emperor Shaddam IV grants Duke Leto Atreides control of the lucrative spice harvesting operations of Arrakis, ousting the Atreides' longtime rivals, the Harkonnens. The Atreides rule is cut short by a murderous conspiracy crafted by the Harkonnens and the Emperor himself. Leto's son Paul Atreides (known by the Fremen as Muad'Dib) later leads a massive Fremen army to victory over the Emperor's Sardaukar soldier-fanatics, and by threatening the destruction of all spice production on Arrakis manages to depose Shaddam and ascend the throne in his place. With Emperor Paul worshipped as a god, Arrakis becomes the governmental and religious center of the Imperium.

Paul Muad'Dib continues the efforts to terraform Arrakis into a green world, a plan begun by the Fremen under the guidance of Imperial Planetologist Pardot Kynes and his son Liet-Kynes. The core of their plan is gradual water-collection from the Arrakeen atmosphere to form large reservoirs that would, eventually, become lakes and oceans. Much of this activity takes place in the unexplored southern latitudes of Arrakis.

By the time of Children of Dune, Alia Atreides (and then Leto II and Ghanima) realize that the ecological transformation of Arrakis is altering the sandworm cycle, which would eventually result in the end of all spice production. This at first seems a future to be avoided, but Leto II later uses this eventuality as part of his Golden Path to ultimately save humanity. Once he himself begins the transformation into a human/sandworm hybrid, he eradicates all desert on Arrakis except for a small area he makes his base of operations, and destroys all of the sandworms save one—himself.

After his death some 3,500 years later in God Emperor of Dune, Leto's worm-body is transformed back into sandtrout. Within only a few centuries, these sandtrout return Arrakis (thence called 'Rakis') to a desert.

In Heretics of Dune, all life on Arrakis is destroyed (and the entire surface of the planet slagged into oblivion) by the Honored Matres in a failed attempt to eliminate the latest Duncan Idaho ghola. The Bene Gesserit escape with a single sandworm, and drown it to revert the worm back into sandtrout. In Chapterhouse: Dune the Bene Gesserit use these sandtrout to begin a new sandworm cycle on their homeworld of Chapterhouse, which is terraformed into desert for this purpose.

Finally, in Sandworms of Dune, some sandworms are revealed to be alive and well, having sensed the upper crust would be destroyed, and therefore burrowed even deeper, escaping the blast.

Cities and features

ARRAKEEN: first settlement on Arrakis; long-time seat of planetary government. — Dune, Terminology of the Imperium
Arrakis' capital and largest city historically is Arrakeen. Arrakeen housed an ostentatious palace, which had been "the government mansion in the days of the Old Empire"; prior to the arrival of the Atreides on Arrakis, the Emperor's right-hand man Count Fenring and his wife Margot had resided there. Leto I had chosen Arrakeen for his seat of government because it "was a smaller city, easier to sterilize and defend."

In Dune, Leto's concubine Lady Jessica has this first impression of the Great Hall:
Jessica stood in the center of the hall [...] looking up and around at shadowed carvings, crannies and deeply recessed windows. This giant anachronism of a room reminded her of the Sisters' Hall at her Bene Gesserit school. But at the school the effect had been of warmth. Here, all was bleak stone. Some architect had reached far back into history for these buttressed walls and dark hangings, she thought. The arched ceiling stood two stories above her with great crossbeams she felt sure had been shipped here to Arrakis across space at monstrous cost. No planet of this system grew trees to make such beams—unless the beams were imitation wood. She thought not.

Arrakeen would go through multiple transformations over time; it first becomes an Imperial capital of staggering proportions under Paul Muad'Dib. It is later transformed into a festival city known as Onn, explicitly for the worship of the Tyrant Leto II. Finally, in the centuries after his death, it is known as Keen, a modern (though still impressive) city to house the Priesthood of Rakis.

Sietch Tabr
In Dune, Sietch Tabr is a major Fremen sietch originally led by Naib Stilgar. Paul Atreides and his mother Lady Jessica, safely escaping from the Harkonnen attack, come upon Sietch Tabr and are eventually accepted into the community. In these Fremen Paul finds an incomparable fighting force who are already disgruntled by Imperial rule. He shapes them into a resistance movement that eventually takes control of Arrakis, allowing Paul to depose the Emperor. Paul moves his base of operations to Arrakeen, but Sietch Tabr remains a center of Fremen culture and politics, as well as a religiously significant site for those who worship Paul as a messiah. All Fremen sietches but one are abandoned after the terraforming of Arrakis, their exact locations remaining a mystery for thousands of years.

The Keep
During the reign of Muad'Dib until the ascension of his son Leto II, the Atreides home-base was a colossal megastructure in Arrakeen, designed to intimidate, known as the Keep. In Dune Messiah, the fortress is described as being large enough to enclose entire cities.

Grand Palace of Arrakeen
In his 1985 short work "The Road to Dune" (published in the short story collection Eye), Frank Herbert described the Grand Palace of Arrakeen (and other sites) during the reign of Paul Atreides:
Your walking tour of Arrakis must include this approach across the dunes to the Grand Palace at Arrakeen. From a distance, the dimensions of this construction are deceptive [...] The largest man-made structure ever built, the Grand Palace could cover more than ten of the Imperium's most populous cities under one roof, a fact that becomes more apparent when you learn Atreides attendants and their families, housed spaciously in the Palace Annex, number some thirty-five million souls [...] When you walk into the Grand Reception Hall of the Palace at Arrakeen, be prepared to feel dwarfed before an immensity never before conceived. A statue of St. Alia Atreides, shown as "The Soother of Pains," stands twenty-two meters tall but is one of the smallest adornments in the hall. Two hundred such statues could be stacked one atop the other against the entrance pillars and still fall short of the doorway's capitol arch, which itself is almost a thousand meters below the first beams upholding the lower roof.

Temple of Alia
Alia's Fane (or Alia's Temple) is the two-kilometer wide temple Paul-Muad'Dib built for his sister Alia between the events of Dune and Dune Messiah. Herbert described it in The Road to Dune:
If you are numbered among "the heartfelt pilgrims," you will cross the last thousand meters of this approach to the Temple of Alia on your knees. Those thousand meters fall well within the sweeping curves leading your eyes up to the transcendent symbols dedicating this Temple to St. Alia of the Knife. The famed "Sun-Sweep Window" incorporates every solar calendar known to human history in the one translucent display whose brilliant colors, driven by the sun of Dune, thread through the interior on prismatic pathways.

The Citadel of Leto II
The Tyrant Leto II rules the universe from the Citadel, a fortress built in the Last Desert of the Sareer. The Sareer is flanked by the Forbidden Forest, home of the ferocious D-wolves, the guardians of the Sareer. Beyond that lies the Idaho River, across which a bridge spans that leads to the festival city of Onn (once Arrakeen). Mount Idaho had been completely demolished to provide the raw materials to build the high walls surrounding the Sareer. The Citadel itself is taken apart in the Famine Times after the death of Leto II in search of his alleged hoard of spice.

Other locations
All Imperial cities on Arrakis are in the far-northern latitudes of the planet and protected from the violent weather of Arrakis by a natural formation known as the Shield Wall. When the Harkonnens controlled the planet, they ruled from the Harkonnen-built "megalopolis" of Carthag, described by Jessica as "a cheap and brassy place some two hundred kilometers northeast across the Broken Land." Arrakeen was merely the titular capital until the arrival of the Atreides.

There are other cities scattered in the northern regions of the planet (especially near the ice cap, where water is harvested), as well as the Fremen sietch communities scattered throughout the desert.

Other notable sites on Arrakis throughout its history include Observatory Mountain, Mount Idaho, Dar-es-balat and the Kynes Sea.

Prequels
The novel Paul of Dune (2008) by Brian Herbert and Kevin J. Anderson establishes that the first known inhabitants of Arrakis had been the Muadru, who introduced the sandworms to the planet. They had settlements all over the galaxy which suddenly disappeared; the Zensunni Wanderers came later, ultimately becoming the Fremen. In the novel Paul notes, "There appears to be a linguistic connection between the Fremen and the Muadru."

Namesakes
 On April 5, 2010, a real-world planitia (plain) on Saturn's moon Titan was named Arrakis Planitia after Herbert's fictional planet.
 Arrakis is also an alternative name for the star Mu Draconis.
 The fictional desert planet of Tatooine in the Star Wars franchise was inspired by the desert planet of Arrakis in Dune.
 The fictional planet of Taros (T'ros) in the Warhammer 40,000 setting is an arid desert planet rich with mineral resources, whose capital city is named Tarokeen. This is a nod to the Dune series, which is one of the many influences of the Warhammer 40,000'' setting.

References

Dune (franchise)
Fictional terrestrial planets
Fictional elements introduced in 1965
Fictional deserts
Fictional planets

de:Handlungsorte der Dune-Zyklen#Arrakis